European Political Community may refer to:

 European Political Community (1952), a failed proposal with a draft treaty to establish an entity in the 1950s
 European Political Community (2022), a forum of European heads of state and government established in 2022

See also
 Treaty establishing the European Political Community (1952)
 European Political Co-operation
 European Council